Maria Anna "Marianna" Madia (born 5 September 1980) is an Italian politician of the Democratic Party and a member of the Italian Chamber of Deputies since 2008.

She was Minister of Public Administration and Simplification from 22 February 2014 to 1 June 2018 (Renzi Cabinet and Gentiloni Cabinet).

Biography 

Madia was born in Rome in 1980. Her family came from Calabria and settled in Rome. Her great-grandfather, Titta Madia, was a lawyer, journalist, and Fascist and MSI member of the Chamber of Deputies. Her father was the politician, journalist and actor Stefano Madia.

She studied at Lycée français Chateaubriand in Rome. She studied at the IMT Institute for Advanced Studies Lucca, specializing in political science.

In June 2013 she married Mario Gianani, a television and film producer. They have twins, Francesco and Margherita, born on 8 April 2014.

She considers herself a practising Catholic.

Career 
Madia began her career in February 2008 when she was chosen by the Secretary of the Democratic Party, Walter Veltroni, who proposed her to be candidate for Chamber of Deputies. In April 2008 she was elected. She was reelected in 2013 and in 2018.

References

External links
 Official Website of Marianna Madia 

21st-century Italian women politicians
1980 births
Living people
Politicians from Rome
Italian Roman Catholics
Democratic Party (Italy) politicians
Deputies of Legislature XVI of Italy
Deputies of Legislature XVII of Italy
Deputies of Legislature XVIII of Italy
Politicians of Lazio
Renzi Cabinet
Women government ministers of Italy
Women members of the Chamber of Deputies (Italy)